Landouria is a genus of gastropods belonging to the subfamily Bradybaeninae of the family Camaenidae.

Distribution
The species of this genus are found in Southeastern Asia.

Species
Landouria abdidalem 
Landouria aborensis 
 Landouria chloritoides Nahok, S. Tumpeesuwan & C. Tumpeesuwan, 2021
Landouria ciliocincta 
 Landouria circinata Nahok, S. Tumpeesuwan & C. Tumpeesuwan, 2021
Landouria coeni 
Landouria conoidea 
Landouria damsangensis 
Landouria davini 
Landouria dharmai 
Landouria dhaulagirica 
 Landouria diplogramme (Möllendorff, 1902)
 Landouria elegans Nahok, S. Tumpeesuwan & C. Tumpeesuwan, 2021
Landouria epiplatia 
Landouria grumulus 
Landouria hengdanensis 
Landouria huttonii 
Landouria intha 
Landouria intumescens 
Landouria leucochila 
Landouria madurensis 
Landouria menorehensis 
Landouria montana 
Landouria monticola 
Landouria moussoniana 
Landouria naggsi 
Landouria nodifera 
Landouria nusakambangensis 
Landouria omphalostoma 
Landouria pacitanensis 
Landouria pakidulan 
Landouria parahyangensis 
Landouria petrukensis 
Landouria politocostata 
Landouria ptychostyla 
Landouria ptychostyloides 
Landouria radleyi 
Landouria rhododendronis 
Landouria rotatoria 
Landouria savadiensis 
Landouria schepmani 
Landouria sewuensis 
Landouria smimensis 
Landouria strobiloides 
Landouria sukoliloensis 
Landouria tholiformis 
Landouria timorensis 
Landouria tonywhitteni 
 Landouria trochomorphoides Nahok, S. Tumpeesuwan & C. Tumpeesuwan, 2021
 Landouria tuberculata Nahok, S. Tumpeesuwan & C. Tumpeesuwan, 2021
Landouria winteriana 
Landouria zonifera

References

 Schileyko, A. A. (2004). Treatise on Recent terrestrial pulmonate molluscs. Part 12. Bradybaenidae, Monadeniidae, Xanthonychidae, Epiphragmophoridae, Helmintoglyptidae, Elonidae, Humboldtianidae, Spincterochilidae, Cochlicellidae. Ruthenica. Supplement 2: 1627-1763. Moskva

External links
 Godwin-Austen, H. H. (1918). Zoological results of the Abor Expedition, 1911-1912. XLIX. Mollusca, IX. Records of the Indian Museum. 8 (12): 601-621. Calcutta

Camaenidae